Jason Swedlow is an American-born cell biologist and light microscopist who is Professor of Quantitative Cell Biology at the School of Life Sciences, University of Dundee, Scotland. He is a co-founder of the Open Microscopy Environment and Glencoe Software. In 2021, he joined Wellcome Leap as a Program Director.

Education and career
Prof. Swedlow received a B.A. in Chemistry from Brandeis University in Waltham, Massachusetts, in 1982. He then earned a Ph.D. in Biophysics from UCSF in 1994, under the direction of Dr. David Agard and Dr. John Sedat. After a postdoctoral fellowship with Dr Tim Mitchison at UCSF and then Harvard Medical School, Dr Swedlow established his own laboratory in 1998 at the Wellcome Trust Biocentre, University of Dundee, as a Wellcome Trust Career Development Fellow. He was awarded a Wellcome Trust Senior Research Fellowship in 2002 and named Professor of Quantitative Cell Biology in 2007. From 2021-2024, he has a part-time secondment as a Program Director at Wellcome Leap, running the Delta Tissue Program. He was named a Fellow of the Royal Society of Edinburgh in 2012 and appointed an Honorary OBE in 2021.

Research
Prof. Swedlow's research focuses on mechanisms and regulation of chromosome segregation during mitotic cell division
and the development of software tools for accessing, processing, sharing and publishing large scientific image datasets. He leads OME, an international consortium that develops and releases open source software for biological imaging and Glencoe Software, which commercialises and customises OME technology for use in academic and biopharmaceutical research (e.g., Columbus from PerkinElmer, CellLibrarian from Yokogawa, and Amira from Thermo Fisher Scientific. He participates in Euro-BioImaging, Global BioImaging, and is co-Founder of BioImagingUK, a consortium of UK imaging scientists that develop, use, or administer imaging solutions for life sciences research. Using OME technology, he has collaborated with EMBL-EBI to develop the Image Data Resource, a public data resource for reference images from bioimaging.

Teaching
Prof. Swedlow has served as Faculty (since 1997) and Co-Director (2009 - 2014) of the Analytical & Quantitative Light Microscopy Course at the Marine Biological Laboratory in Woods Hole, Massachusetts, and participates as Faculty in the NCBS Bangalore Microscopy Course.

Family
Prof. Swedlow is married to Dr Melpomeni Platani, and has two children, Jan and Lena.

References 

Living people
Harvard Medical School alumni
21st-century American biologists
Brandeis University alumni
University of California, San Francisco alumni
American emigrants to Scotland
1961 births
Academics of the University of Dundee
Fellows of the Royal Society of Edinburgh
People from Los Angeles